Unfreedom: Blemished light (Hindi title: Dagh Ujala) is a 2014 Indian drama film by Raj Amit Kumar, which was released in North America on 29 May 2015. Faiz Ahmad Faiz's poem, "Ye Dagh Dagh Ujala", is the inspiration behind the film. The film stars Victor Banerjee, Adil Hussain. and Preeti Gupta.

The story revolves around a Muslim fundamentalist in New York who kidnaps a liberal Muslim scholar with an intent to kill, while a closeted lesbian in New Delhi kidnaps her bisexual lover with the intent of being together. Then the resulting torture and violence evokes a brutal struggle of identities against "unfreedom".

Cast

 Victor Banerjee as Fareed Rahmani
 Adil Hussain as Devraj Singh, Leela's police officer father
 Bhanu Uday as Hussain  
 Preeti Gupta as Leela Singh
 Bhavani Lee as Sakhi Taylor 
 Ankur Vikal as Najeeb
 Seema Rahmani as Chandra
 Samrat Chakrabarti as Anees 
 Danae Nason as Jana 
 Andrew Platner as Mitch
 Danny Boushebel as Malik 
 Dilip Shankar as Sameer
 Alyy Khan as Alyy 
 Kuldeep Sareen as Janaka
 Jatin Sarna as Janaka's Officer 
 Shayan Munshi as Anand, Sakhi's beau
 Swaroopa Ghosh as Eiravati 
 Yash Kansara as young Hussain 
 Rayvin Disla as Jordan
 John Castaldo as Morris
 Nalin Singh as Jishnu
 Bubbales Sabharwal as Dr Malik
 Nikki Chawla as Alvina, Hussain's mother
 Kedarnath as Fiamanullah
 Sudeep Solanki as Jimmy, art buyer
 Darlene Heller as Jessica
 Sachin Verma as Hiresh
 Manoj Bakshi as Prithu
 Vanya Joshi as Ujas

Production
Hari Nair is the cinematographer of the film with Wayne Sharpe and Jesse Kotansky composing the soundtrack.  Resul Pookutty did the sound design. Deepa Bajaj, who also was the post-production producer, worked on the publicity campaign and distribution of the film.

In India, the Central Board of Film Certification refused to certify the movie for public release in India.

Censorship
In India, the film was refused certification by the Examining Committee. A revising committee of the Censor Board proposed cuts to the director, Raj Amit Kumar. He refused and appealed against the Censor Board's demand for cuts to the Indian Government's Information and Broadcasting Appellate Tribunal FCAT. In response to his appeal, the authorities completely banned the film regardless of cuts. The news of the ban gained widespread coverage in the media.

In a video released on April 9, 2015 on YouTube, Raj Amit Kumar states that the Censor Board should rate or certify a movie, instead of banning and offering cuts. He also said that he would keep sending signed petitions to the Prime Minister and Censor Board, until there is a real change. The director is seeking support from people who believe in freedom of speech.

References

External links
 
 
 
 
 

Films about religious violence in India
Films set in Delhi
Films set in Uttar Pradesh
Films set in Chicago
2010s Hindi-language films
Indian LGBT-related films
Lesbian-related films
LGBT-related romantic drama films
Indian political drama films
2014 films
Fictional portrayals of police departments in India
2014 directorial debut films
Indian romantic drama films
2014 LGBT-related films